Mount Andrews is a mountain,  high, standing between Mount Danforth and Mount Gerdel on the south side of Albanus Glacier, in the Queen Maud Mountains of Antarctica.

The mountain was mapped by the United States Geological Survey from surveys and from U.S. Navy air photos, 1960–63.  It was named by the Advisory Committee on Antarctic Names for Ensign Stanley J. Andrews, U.S. Navy, who accompanied Lieutenant George W. Warden in aircraft flights over the Queen Maud Mountains during U.S. Navy Operation Highjump, 1946–47.

References
 

Mountains of Marie Byrd Land
Queen Maud Mountains